Wasted: The Preppie Murder is a book by Linda Wolfe, published by Simon & Schuster in 1989.

It is about Jennifer Levin's murder by Robert E. Chambers Jr.

Awards
The book was named a Notable Book of the Year by the New York Times.  It was nominated for an Edgar Award.

Reception
The New York Times book reviewer Michale M. Thomas called it "an excellent, valuable book." The Los Angeles Times gave it a mixed review. Kirkus Reviews called it a "copiously researched summing up of a sad, sad story."

References

1989 non-fiction books
Non-fiction books about murders in the United States
American non-fiction books
Simon & Schuster books